Yuriko Kotani is an England-based Japanese comedian and the BBC Radio New Comedy Award 2015 winner. She was the first Japanese person to win the award. She debuted her solo show, Somosomo, at Edinburgh Fringe in 2019. Kotani's comedy makes fun of the cultural differences between London and her homeland of Japan. She has been noted for delivering her comedy in English, despite Japanese being her first language.

Early life and career 
Born and raised in Japan, Kotani moved to the UK in 2005 and began performing stand-up in 2014.

Breakthrough 
In 2015 Kotani was nominated for a number of awards for her comedy. Most notably, in November 2015 she won the BBC Radio New Comedy Award.

She was named as "One To Watch" by Time Out in 2015. She went on to become first runner-up in So You Think You're Funny 2015?, won the Brighton Comedy Festival Squawker Award 2015, placed third in the Leicester Square Theatre New Comedian of the Year 2015, and was nominated for Leicester Mercury Comedian of the Year in 2016.

On the radio, Kotani has been interviewed on The Comedy Club on BBC Radio 4 Extra.

Kotani has made a number of appearances on British television. In 2016, Kotani appeared on series 2 of Russell Howard's Stand Up Central.

In March 2017, Kotani made her TV acting debut in the BBC Three series, Pls Like.

In January 2018, Kotani appeared on the CBBC panel show, The Dog Ate My Homework. In 2020, Kotani appeared in an episode of Paul Hollywood Eats Japan on Channel 4.

In May 2021 she starred alongside Rich Keeble as a scientist extracting DNA from present and former players in a comedy film unveiling Southampton Football Club's new 2021/22 season kit. Players featured in the film included James Ward-Prowse, Matt Le Tissier and Francis Benali.

References

External links

Year of birth missing (living people)
Living people
Japanese stand-up comedians
British stand-up comedians
Japanese women comedians
Japanese expatriates in the United Kingdom
Japanese comedians
British women comedians
21st-century British comedians